Isaac "Ike" James Villanueva (born April 4, 1984), is an American mixed martial artist who competed in the Light Heavyweight division of the Ultimate Fighting Championship.

Mixed martial arts career

Early career

Starting his career in 2008, Villanueva compiled a 17–9 record fighting for various Texas regional promotions. During this time, he would lose to future UFC fighters, Cody Donovan, Justin Ledet, and Trevin Giles, as well lose to accomplished IBJJF World Championship and the ADCC Submission Wrestling World Championship winner, Robert Drysdale, who he would lose to by first round submission.

He also knocked out UFC vet Roger Narvaez in 28 seconds at Fury FC 36 on August 30, 2019, which won him the Fury FC Light Heavyweight Championship.

He would defend this title against just released from the UFC, Rashad Coulter at Fury FC 40 on December 13, 2019. After knocking down Coulter early in the fight, he eventually finished him by technical knockout later in the round.

Ultimate Fighting Championship

Villanueva made his UFC debut against Chase Sherman on May 13, 2020 at UFC Fight Night: Smith vs. Teixeira. Being outclassed on the feet, Villanueva lost the fight via technical knockout in round two. After the fight Sherman received nine month USADA suspension for testing positive for Anastrozole from a in-competition sample collected on May 13, 2020.

Villanueva was expected to face Jorge Gonzalez on August 15, 2020 at UFC 252. However, due to alleged visa issues for Gonzalez, the pairing was rescheduled for UFC on ESPN: Munhoz vs. Edgar on August 22, 2020. In turn, Gonzalez was removed from the card for undisclosed reasons and replaced by promotional newcomer Jordan Wright. Isaac lost in the first round after being cut badly, leading to a doctor's stoppage.

Villanueva was scheduled to face Vinicius Moreira on January 30, 2021. In late December 2020, the UFC opted against holding an event on a planned January 30 date and decided to reschedule several bouts to January 20, 2021 at UFC on ESPN: Chiesa vs. Magny.

Villanueva faced Vinicius Moreira on January 20, 2021, at UFC on ESPN: Chiesa vs. Magny. He won the fight via knockout in the second round.

As the first bout of his new four-fight contract, Villaneuva faced Marcin Prachnio on June 26, 2021 at UFC Fight Night 190. He lost the fight via TKO in the second round after being kicked in the liver.

Villanueva faced Nicolae Negumereanu on October 23, 2021 at UFC Fight Night: Costa vs. Vettori. He lost the fight via TKO in round one. Though there was controversy as replays showed Negumereanu landing illegal strikes to the back of Villanueva's head after the knockdown that led to the finish.

Villanueva faced Tyson Pedro on April 23, 2022 at UFC Fight Night 205. He lost the fight via knockout in the first round.

On May 6, 2022 it was announced that Villanueva was no longer on the UFC roster.

Personal life
Isaac worked a day job as a CNC machinist outside of his fighting career, before he signed with the UFC. He has two sons born in 2014 and had a daughter Gianna born in September 2020.

Championships and achievements

Mixed martial arts
Fury Fighting Championship 
 Fury FC Light Heavyweight Championship (One Time)
One successful defense

Mixed martial arts record

|-
|Loss
|align=center|18–14
|Tyson Pedro
|KO (leg kick and punches)
|UFC Fight Night: Lemos vs. Andrade
|
|align=center|1
|align=center|4:55
|Las Vegas, Nevada, United States
|
|-
|Loss
|align=center|18–13
|Nicolae Negumereanu
|TKO (punches)
|UFC Fight Night: Costa vs. Vettori
|
|align=center|1
|align=center|1:18
|Las Vegas, Nevada, United States
|
|-
|Loss
|align=center|18–12
|Marcin Prachnio
|KO (body kick)
|UFC Fight Night: Gane vs. Volkov
|
|align=center|2
|align=center|0:56
|Las Vegas, Nevada, United States
|
|-
| Win
| align=center| 18–11
| Vinicius Moreira
| KO (punch)
| UFC on ESPN: Chiesa vs. Magny
| 
| align=center|2
| align=center|0:39
| Abu Dhabi, United Arab Emirates
|
|-
| Loss
| align=center| 17–11
| Jordan Wright
| TKO (doctor stoppage)
| UFC on ESPN: Munhoz vs. Edgar
|
|align=Center|1
|align=center|1:31
|Las Vegas, Nevada, United States
| 
|-
| Loss
| align=center| 17–10
| Chase Sherman
|TKO (punches and elbow)
|UFC Fight Night: Smith vs. Teixeira
|
|align=center|2
|align=center|0:49
|Jacksonville, Florida, United States
|
|-
| Win
| align=center| 17–9
| Rashad Coulter
|TKO (punches)
|Fury FC 40
|
|align=center|1
|align=center|3:17
|Humble, Texas, United States
|
|-
|-
| Win
| align=center| 16–9
| Roger Narvaez
| TKO (punches)
| Fury FC 36
| 
| align=center|1
| align=center|0:28
| Robstown, Texas, United States
|
|-
| Win
| align=center| 15–9
| Juan Torres
| TKO (punches)
| Fury FC 33
| 
| align=center| 1
| align=center| 2:59
| Houston, Texas, United States
|
|-
| Win
| align=center|14–9
| Patrick Miller
| TKO (punches)
| Fury FC 16
| 
| align=center| 1
| align=center| 2:05
| Humble, Texas, United States
|
|-
| Loss
| align=center|13–9
| Antonio Jones
|Decision (split)
| Fury FC 15
| 
|align=center|3
|align=center|3:00
| Humble, Texas, United States
|
|-
| Win
| align=center|13–8
|Matt Jones
|Decision (unanimous)
|TKO Fight Alliance
|
|align=center|3
|align=center|5:00
|Houston, Texas, United States
|
|-
| Loss
| align=center|12–8
|Trevin Giles
|Submission (arm-triangle choke)
|Legacy FC 59
|
|align=center|3
|align=center|1:45
|Houston, Texas, United States
|
|-
| Win
| align=center|12–7
| Brandon Farran
| Decision (unanimous)
| Legacy FC 55
| 
|align=center|3
|align=center|5:00
| Houston, Texas, United States
|
|-
| Win
| align=center| 11–7
| Richard Knepp
| TKO (punches)
| Bellator 149
| 
| align=center| 1
| align=center| 0:42
| Houston, Texas, United States
| 
|-
| Win
| align=center| 10–7
| Husam Mohamed
| TKO (punch)
|Fury Fighting 9
|
|align=Center|1
|align=center|1:08
|Humble, Texas, United States
| 
|-
| Win
| align=center| 9–7
| Kyle Keeney
| TKO (punches)
| Fury Fighting 8
| 
| align=center| 1
| align=center| 0:24
| Humble, Texas, United States
| 
|-
| Loss
| align=center| 8–7
| Robert Drysdale
|Submission (armbar)
|Legacy FC 12
|
|align=center|1
|align=center|1:27
|Houston, Texas, United States
|
|-
| Loss
| align=center| 8–6
| Justin Ledet
|Submission (armbar)
|Immortal Kombat Fighting
|
|align=center|3
|align=center|0:40
|Spring, Texas, United States
|
|-
| Loss
| align=center| 8–5
| Larry Crowe
| KO (head kick)
| Legacy FC 8
| 
| align=center| 2
| align=center| 1:57
| Houston, Texas, United States
|
|-
| Win
| align=center|8–4
| Alexander Pappas
| TKO (punches)
|  International Xtreme Fight Association
| 
| align=center| 1
| align=center| 1:32
| Houston, Texas, United States
|
|-
| Win
| align=center|7–4
| Brian Lightfoot
|TKO (punches)
|  International Xtreme Fight Association
| 
| align=center|1
| align=center|1:36
|Houston, Texas, United States
|
|-
| Win
| align=center|6–4
|Dwight Gipson
|KO (punches)
|TCF Puro Combate 2
|
|align=center|1
|align=center|0:58
|Houston, Texas, United States
|
|-
| Loss
| align=center|5–4
| Artenas Young
|TKO (punches)
|Legacy Promotions
|
|align=center|3
|align=center|1:43
|Houston, Texas, United States
|
|-
| Win
| align=center|5–3
| Chase Watson
| Decision (unanimous)
| Shark Fights 12
| 
|align=center|3
|align=center|5:00
| Amarillo, Texas, United States
|
|-
| Win
| align=center| 4–3
| Josh Luna
| TKO (punches)
|Shark Fights 10
|
|align=center|1
|align=center|0:28
|Lubbock, Texas, United States
| 
|-
| Loss
| align=center| 3–3
| Cody Donovan
|Submission (rear-naked choke)
|Ascend Combat: The Beginning
|
|align=center|2
|align=center|4:52
|Shreveport, Louisiana, United States
|
|-
| Loss
| align=center| 3–2
| Marcus Sursa
| Submission (guillotine choke)
| Shark Fights 6
| 
| align=center| 1
| align=center| 2:06
| Amarillo, Texas, United States
| 
|-
| Win
| align=center| 3–1
| Dale Mitchell
| TKO (punches)
| URC 5
| 
| align=center| 1
| align=center| 1:23
| Conroe, Texas, United States
| 
|-
| Win
| align=center| 2–1
| Jason Basset
| KO (punch)
| SWC 6
| 
| align=center| 1
| align=center| 0:20
| Frisco, Texas, United States
| 
|-
| Win
| align=center| 1–1
| Daniel Andrews
| TKO (punches)
| SWC 5
| 
| align=center| 1
| align=center| 2:41
| Frisco, Texas, United States
|
|-
| Loss
| align=center| 0–1
| JR Christy
| TKO (punches)
| Katana Cagefighting: Conquest
| 
| align=center| 1
| align=center| 2:19
| Robstown, Texas, United States
|

See also 
 List of male mixed martial artists

References

External links 
  
 

Living people
1984 births
American male mixed martial artists
Light heavyweight mixed martial artists
Ultimate Fighting Championship male fighters
Sportspeople from Houston
Mixed martial artists from Texas